Ruben T. Profugo (April 10, 1938 – May 12, 2014) was a Roman Catholic bishop.

Ordained to the priesthood in 1965, Profugo was named auxiliary bishop of the Diocese of Lucena, Philippine in 1979 and diocesan bishop of the Lucena Diocese in 1982. He resigned in 2003.

Notes

1938 births
2014 deaths
21st-century Roman Catholic bishops in the Philippines
20th-century Roman Catholic bishops in the Philippines
Roman Catholic bishops of Lucena